Casino Jack (known in certain territories as Bagman) is a 2010 comedy-drama thriller film directed by George Hickenlooper and starring Kevin Spacey. The film focuses on the career of Washington, D.C. lobbyist and businessman Jack Abramoff, who was involved in a massive corruption scandal that led to his conviction as well as the conviction of two White House officials, Rep. Bob Ney, and nine other lobbyists and congressional staffers. Abramoff was convicted of fraud, conspiracy and tax evasion in 2006, and of trading expensive gifts, meals and vacations for political favors.  
Abramoff served three and a half years of a six-year sentence in federal prison, and was then assigned to a halfway house. He was released on December 3, 2010.

Spacey was nominated for a Golden Globe Award for Best Actor – Motion Picture Musical or Comedy for his portrayal of Abramoff, eventually losing to Paul Giamatti for his role in Barney's Version.

Plot

A hot shot Washington DC lobbyist and his protégé go down hard as their schemes to peddle influence lead to corruption and murder.

Cast
 Kevin Spacey as Jack Abramoff
 Kelly Preston as Pam Abramoff
 Rachelle Lefevre as Emily J. Miller
 Barry Pepper as Michael Scanlon
 Jon Lovitz as Adam Kidan
 John David Whalen as Kevin A. Ring
 Yannick Bisson as Oscar Carillo
 Graham Greene as Bernie Sprague
 Eric Schweig as Chief Poncho
 Maury Chaykin as Anthony "Big Tony" Moscatiello
 Christian Campbell as Ralph Reed
 Spencer Garrett as Tom DeLay
 Joe Pingue as Anthony "Little Tony" Ferrari
 David Fraser as Karl Rove
 Jeffrey R. Smith as Grover Norquist
 Daniel Kash as Gus Boulis
 Conrad Pla as FBI Agent Hanley
 Hannah Endicott-Douglas as Sarah Abramoff
 Ruth Marshall as Susan Schmidt
 Reid Morgan as Brian Mann
 Duke Redbird as Senator Nighthorse

Production

Filming took place in June 2009 in various locations across Hamilton, Ontario, Canada, including McMaster University and downtown Hamilton. The film was scheduled for release in December 2010 and premiered at the Toronto International Film Festival.

This was Hickenlooper's final film. He died on October 29, 2010, seven weeks before its scheduled December 17, 2010, national opening.

Reception
Casino Jack received mixed reviews from critics. On Rotten Tomatoes, the film has a rating of 39%, based on 97 reviews, with an average rating of 5.4/10. The website's critical consensus reads, "Kevin Spacey turns in one of his stronger performances, but Casino Jack is a disappointingly uneven fictionalized account of a fascinating true story." On Metacritic, the film has a score of 51 out of 100, based on 24 critics, indicating "mixed or average reviews".

Roger Ebert gave the film three out of four stars, stating that "Casino Jack is so forthright, it is stunning."

References

External links
 
 
 
 
 
 Casino Jack production website at Hannibal Pictures

2010 films
Canadian comedy-drama films
2010 comedy-drama films
Canadian docudrama films
Films set in the 1990s
Films set in the 2000s
Films set in Washington, D.C.
Canadian biographical films
Films shot in Ontario
Canadian political satire films
Films about con artists
Films about fraud
2010s English-language films
2010s Canadian films